2nd Division may refer to the following military units:

Infantry divisions
2nd Division (Australia)
2nd Canadian Division
2nd Division (Colombia)
2nd Infantry Division (France)
2nd Moroccan Infantry Division (France)
2nd Division (Estonia) (1918–40)
2nd Division (German Empire) (1818–1919)
2nd Division (Reichswehr) (Germany, 1920–34)
2nd Infantry Division (Wehrmacht), Germany
2nd Naval Infantry Division (Wehrmacht), Germany
2nd Mountain Division (Wehrmacht), Germany
2nd Guards Infantry Division (German Empire)
2nd Mechanized Infantry Division (Greece)
2nd (Rawalpindi) Division, British Indian Army before and during World War I
2nd Infantry Division (India)
2nd Division (Iraq) (1930s–2003; 2005–2014)
2nd Alpine Division "Tridentina", Kingdom of Italy
2nd CC.NN. Division "28 Ottobre", Kingdom of Italy
2nd Infantry Division "Sforzesca", Kingdom of Italy
2nd Division (Imperial Japanese Army)
2nd Guards Division (Imperial Japanese Army)
2nd Division (Japan) (1962–)
2nd New Zealand Division
2nd Division (Nigeria)
2nd Division (North Korea)
2nd Division (Norway)
2nd Infantry Division (Philippines)
2nd Legions Infantry Division (Poland)
2nd Lithuanian–Belarusian Division (Poland)
2nd Division (Portugal) (1917–18)
2nd Infantry Division (South Africa)
2nd Infantry Division (South Korea)
2nd Division (South Vietnam) (1955–75)
2nd Rifle Division (Soviet Union)
2nd Division (Spain)
2nd Infantry Division (Thailand), Queen's Guard
2nd (African) Division (United Kingdom)
2nd Infantry Division (United Kingdom)
2nd (London) Infantry Division
2nd Infantry Division (United States)
2nd Marine Division (United States)
2nd Division (Vietnam)

Airborne divisions
2nd Airborne Division (United Kingdom)
2nd Parachute Division (Germany)

Cavalry divisions
2nd Light Cavalry Division (France)
2nd Cavalry Division (German Empire)
2nd Cavalry Division (Reichswehr), Weimar Republic
2nd Light Division (Wehrmacht), Germany
2nd Indian Cavalry Division, British Indian Army during World War I
2nd Cavalry Division Emanuele Filiberto Testa di Ferro, Italian Army during World War II
2nd Guards Cavalry Division (Russian Empire)
2nd Cavalry Division (United Kingdom)
2nd Mounted Division, United Kingdom
2/2nd Mounted Division, United Kingdom, later 3rd Mounted Division
2nd Cavalry Division (United States)

Armoured divisions
2nd Armoured Division (Australia)
2nd Armored Division (France)
2nd Light Mechanized Division (France)
2nd Panzer Division (Wehrmacht), Germany
2nd Tank Division (Imperial Japanese Army)
2nd SS Panzer Division Das Reich
2nd Armoured Division (United Kingdom)
2nd Armored Division (United States)
2nd Guards Tank Division (Soviet Union)

See also 
2nd Regiment (disambiguation)